Party Party: Thelma Remix is a remix album by Japanese Pop/R&B singer Thelma Aoyama. It was released on December 10, 2008. The album debuted outside Oricon album Chart Top 40, #79, with initial sales of 2,705 copies.

Track listing
Higher （Makai Remix） - 4:17
Mama e （ママへ; To Mom; Kentaro　Takizawa　Remix） - 5:59
Rhythm (リズム; Yasutaka　Nakata（capsule）　Remix) - 4:48
Paradise （SUGIURUMN　Remix） - 7'56
Diary （A　Hundred　Birds　Remix） - 7'13
Kono Mama De （このままで; Like This; Jazztronik　Remix） - 4:54
Last Letter （FreeTEMPO Remix） - 5:56
One Way （M−Swift　Broken　Beat　mix） - 5:23

Charts
Oricon Sales Chart (Japan)

References

External links 
Thelma Aoyama LOVE! ~THELMA LOVESONG COLLECTION~ - Universal J

Thelma Aoyama albums
2009 remix albums
Universal Music Group remix albums